A Borobudur ship is the 8th to 9th-century wooden double outrigger sailing vessel of Maritime Southeast Asia depicted in some bas reliefs of the Borobudur Buddhist monument in Central Java, Indonesia. It is a ship of Javanese people, derivative vessels of similar size still survived in East Java coastal trade at least until the 1940s.

Characteristics 
The characteristics of the ships of the Borobudur temple include: Having outriggers that are not as long as their hulls, bipod or tripod mast with a canted square sail (tanja sail), a bowsprit with a spritsail, rowing gallery (where people row by sitting or standing), deckhouse, have oculi (carved/bossed eyes), and quarter rudders. Some ships are depicted with oars, numbering at least 6, 8, or 9, and some others have none.

Common misconceptions 
There are some common misconceptions about the Borobudur ship:

 The ship depicted in the Borobudur temple is an Indian ship. This opinion is supported by Indian and Dutch scholars who attribute the influence of India to the kingdoms of the Nusantara Archipelago ("Indianization"), so the ship depicted in the temple must have come from India. This also stems from the notion that Javanese ships are inferior to Indian ships. This argument has been debunked, the Javanese were experienced navigators and built large ships, as early as the first millennium CE (see kolandiaphonta). The characteristics actually indicate Indonesian origin: The presence of outriggers, the use of canted sails with a lower boom, the use of bipod and tripod mast, and rowing galleries.
 The ship was a Srivijayan ship or a Malay ship. There is absolutely no evidence to support this statement. In the Srivijaya era, the type of watercraft is rarely recorded, the type of Malay boat recorded is the samvau (modern Malay: Sampan) on the Kedukan Bukit inscription (683 AD) in Sumatra. Another recorded watercraft is the lancang, from 2 inscriptions on the northern coast of Bali written in the Old Balinese language dated 896 and 923 AD. Meanwhile, the Borobudur ship is only found in the Borobudur temple, which is a Javanese heritage, not Malay.
 The Borobudur ship is a Majapahit ship. In fact, historical accounts of the main ships of Majapahit mention the jong, malangbang, and kelulus, all of which do not have outriggers.

Plate renderings
Renderings of the five ships with outriggers in the Borobudur bas-reliefs (out of seven ships depicted in total) in Conradus Leemans's Boro-Boedoer (1873). Note that the ships are of different types.

Replica 

 The earliest replica of this ship was made in the Philippines in 1985, based on the Pontian boat structure. It is called Sarimanok (lucky little bird), used to sail to Java and Madagascar.
 The least known replica was named Damar Sagara, completed in 1992.
 The well known replica, Samudra Raksa, is housed at Samudra Raksa museum, Magelang, Central Java, Indonesia, built in 2003. It sailed to the Seychelles, Madagascar, South Africa and Ghana between August 2003 and February 2004.
 One replica is moored on Marine March of Resorts World Sentosa dock in Singapore.
 Borobudur relief serve as the basis for constructing "Spirit of Majapahit", a replica of Majapahit ship. This replica has received criticism from historians, because the ship used by Majapahit is jong while the Borobudur relief ship is an earlier vessel.
 A replica of Borobudur ship was featured in the opening ceremony of the Asian Games 2018 on 18 August 2018 in Gelora Bung Karno Stadium, Jakarta.

In popular culture 

 Borobudur ship and ship carving are featured in the Age of Empires II expansion pack, Rise of the Rajas, and its remaster, Age of Empires II: Definitive Edition.
Borobudur ship serve as the basis for the model of Majapahit Jong in video game Civilization VI, with double outriggers, double quarter rudders, and rowers.

See also
 Karakoa
 Kora kora
K'un-lun po (kolandiaphonta), a type of vessel used in the archipelago as early as 2nd century A.D.

Notes

References

External links
Note: The following two links are dead. Could someone help please?

 "From Indonesia to Africa - Borobudur Ship Expedition." Philip Beale. 2006.pdf  Retrieved 3 November 2015

Ships of Indonesia
Borobudur
2003 in Indonesia
2004 in Indonesia
Outrigger canoes
Indigenous boats
Indonesian inventions
Sailboat types
Sailing ship types